Chloranil is a quinone with the molecular formula C6Cl4O2. Also known as tetrachloro-1,4-benzoquinone, it is a yellow solid. Like the parent benzoquinone, chloranil is a planar molecule that functions as a mild oxidant.

Synthesis and use as reagent
Chloranil is produced by chlorination of phenol to give hexachlorocyclohexa-2,5-dien-1-one ("hexachlorophenol").  Hydrolysis of the dichloromethylene group in this dienone gives chloranil:
C6H5OH  +  6 Cl2  →   C6Cl6O  +  6 HCl
C6Cl6O  +  H2O  →   C6Cl4O2  +  2 HCl

Chloroanil serves as a hydrogen acceptor. It is more electrophilic than quinone itself.  It is used for the aromatization reactions, such as the conversion of cyclohexadienes to the benzene derivatives.

Chloranil is used to test for free secondary amines. This test is useful for checking for the presence of proline derivatives. It is also a good test for the successful deprotection of a secondary amine. Secondary amines react with chloranil to give a brown/red/orange derivative, the colour depending on the amine.  In these reactions, the amine displaces chloride from the ring of the quinone.

Commercial applications
It is a precursor to many dyes, such as pigment violet 23 and diaziquone (AZQ), a cancer chemotherapeutic agent.

See also
 Chloranilic acid
 2,3-Dichloro-5,6-dicyano-1,4-benzoquinone (DDQ)

References

External links
 

Organochlorides
Fungicides
1,4-Benzoquinones
Oxidizing agents